Constitutional Assembly elections were held in Uruguay on 30 July 1916. The National Party emerged as the largest party, winning 105 of the 218 seats.

Results

See also
Constitution of Uruguay

References

Elections in Uruguay
Uruguay
Constitutional
Uruguay